Three U.S. states, Minnesota, Oregon, and Texas, have officially declared a state mushroom. Minnesota was the first to declare a species; Morchella esculenta was chosen as its state mushroom in 1984, and codified into Statute in 2010. Three other states, Missouri, Washington, and New York have had state mushrooms proposed.


Current state mushrooms

Proposed state mushrooms

Notes

References

United States
Mushrooms
Mushrooms